Tsurtsumia is a Georgian surname. Notable people with the surname include:
Georgiy Tsurtsumia (born 1980), Kazakh wrestler 
Lela Tsurtsumia (born 1969), Georgian pop singer
Nugzari Tsurtsumia (born 1997), Georgian Greco-Roman wrestler 

Surnames of Georgian origin
Georgian-language surnames
Surnames of Abkhazian origin